The Black College Football Hall of Fame Classic is a college football kickoff game that has been played annually since 2019 at Tom Benson Hall of Fame Stadium in Canton, Ohio. The game features a matchup of two historically black colleges and universities (HBCUs). It is played on the Sunday before Labor Day. The Classic originated in 2019, with a matchup between the Alabama A&M Bulldogs and the Morehouse Maroon Tigers, and coincided with the Black College Football Hall of Fame's move to Canton from its previous location in Atlanta.

The 2020 edition of the Classic, scheduled between Howard and Central State, was announced to have been cancelled on July 3, 2020, over concerns related to the COVID-19 pandemic.

Since its inception the game has been carried nationally by NFL Network

Game results

References 

College football kickoff games
Recurring sporting events established in 2019
American football in Ohio
Sports competitions in Ohio
2008 establishments in Ohio
Pro Football Hall of Fame
Sports and historically black universities and colleges in the United States